Abel Mendoza (born January 7, 2003) is an American soccer player who plays as a midfielder for USL Championship club Real Monarchs.

Club career
Born in Las Vegas, Nevada, Mendoza began his career with the Las Vegas Soccer Academy before joining the youth academy program of Major League Soccer club Real Salt Lake. 

In 2018, he joined Real Salt Lake. 

In August 2020, Mendoza and other members of the Real Salt Lake under-19s refused to practice after racist remarks made by the club's owner Dell Loy Hansen.

On May 14, 2021, Mendoza joined Real Salt Lake's affiliate USL Championship squad Real Monarchs, coming on as an 80th minute substitute in their match against LA Galaxy II.

International career
Mendoza has been called up into the United States U16 side.

Career statistics

Club

References

External links
 Profile at U.S. Soccer Development Academy

2003 births
Living people
Sportspeople from Las Vegas
Soccer players from Las Vegas
American soccer players
Association football midfielders
Real Monarchs players
USL Championship players
Soccer players from Nevada